The filler metal (FM) alloys that can be produced as amorphous brazing foils (ABF) are eutectic compositions formed by transition metals such as nickel, iron, copper, etc., in combination with metalloids, such as silicon, boron and phosphorus. In conventional crystalline state, all these materials are inherently brittle and cannot be produced in continuous forms such as foil, wire, etc. Therefore, they were available only as powders, pastes, or their derivates. On the other hand, the very presence of metalloids at or near the eutectic concentration promotes the rapid solidification (RS) conversion of such alloys into a ductile amorphous foil.

Production
The production of amorphous alloys requires a manufacturing technology that operates on the basis of the necessary cooling rates, which is known as rapid solidification, or melt spinning technology. Amorphous structures are characterized by the absence of a crystal lattice or a long range order. With this random, spatially uniform arrangement of the constituent atoms, their structure is similar to that of liquids.
The nature of this production process is the reason why amorphous alloys are offered only in the form of thin, ductile metal foils. Subsequently, tapes, parts and preforms can be made by e.g. slitting, cutting, stamping and etching.

Properties
Amorphous brazing foils are compositionally much more uniform even after crystallization, they melt over a narrow temperature range under transient heating. This is a consequence of the shorter distances over which atoms of different elements have to diffuse in order to form a uniform liquid phase. The resulting instant melting and their superior flow characteristic is only one of the important features of ABFs. The absence of the residual organic solvent bases evident in powder paste/tapes correspondingly eliminates soot formation and furnace fouling. The low level of gaseous impurities in ABFs, due to the specific characteristics of its production technology, is an attractive feature for vacuum furnace brazing.

Usage
ABFs are available as strip with a width from 0.5 mm to 125 mm and a thickness from 20 µm to 50 µm. Preforms can be easily produced by using punch and die, cutting/slitting, photochemical etching, and other methods. It is simple to use foils and preforms at automatic production and assembling steps. The use of foils and preforms reduces waste and enhances manufacturing efficiency. Drying and evaporation operations, which are required with powder/paste and tape forms, are not necessary. The optimal amount of brazing material can be easily applied to the component and, in just one heating cycle, ABFs create uniform braze joints of outstanding quality.

External links 
 Metal Leaching of Brazed Stainless Steel Joints into Drinking Water
 Nickel-Chromium-Based Amorphous Brazing Foils for Continuous Furnace Brazing of Stainless Steel
 New Amorphous Brazing Foils for Exhaust Gas Application
 Brazing With (NiCoCr)-B-Si Amorphous Brazing Filler Metals: Alloys, Processing, Joint Structure, Properties, Applications
 Brazing Cemented Carbides: Specifics, Braze Optimization and Custom-Designed Amorphous Brazing Filler Metals
 Brazing with Amorphous Foil Preforms
 Amorphous Brazing Foils VITROBRAZE

Metallurgy
Brazing and soldering